Jean-Jacques Moine (7 September 1954 – 14 February 2022) was a French swimmer. He competed in the men's 4 × 200 metre freestyle relay at the 1972 Summer Olympics. Moine died on 14 February 2022, at the age of 67.

References

External links
 

1954 births
2022 deaths
Place of birth missing
French male freestyle swimmers
Olympic swimmers of France
Swimmers at the 1972 Summer Olympics